Platycnemis sikassoensis is a species of damselfly in the family Platycnemididae. It is found in Benin, Central African Republic, Ivory Coast, Gambia, Ghana, Guinea, Liberia, Mali, Nigeria, Senegal, Sierra Leone, Togo, and Uganda. Its natural habitats are subtropical or tropical moist lowland forests and rivers.

References

Platycnemididae
Insects described in 1912
Taxonomy articles created by Polbot
Taxobox binomials not recognized by IUCN